Roy Braverman (born April 28, 1954) is an American sound supervisor, sound editor, and composer, known for his work on Dexter's Laboratory, The Fairly OddParents, Xiaolin Showdown, Phineas and Ferb, The Batman, and the Bionicle films. His works have been nominated for twenty Golden Reel Awards, winning four, and five Daytime Emmy Awards, winning two.

Career
Braverman's first credit in the sound department was in 1983's Winnie the Pooh and a Day for Eeyore. He has since worked on The Transformers: The Movie, Muppet Babies, The Jetsons, Yogi's Treasure Hunt, Jem, The Flintstone Kids, and various other works, usually for The Walt Disney Company, Nickelodeon, or Hanna-Barbera/Cartoon Network Studios, throughout the 1980s, 1990s, 2000s, and 2010s. He has won two Daytime Emmy Awards and four Golden Reel Awards for his sound editing.

Accolades

References

External links
 
 

1954 births
Daytime Emmy Award winners
Living people
American composers